The 1894 Tuapeka by-election was a by-election held on 9 July 1894 during the 12th New Zealand Parliament in the rural lower South Island electorate of .

The by-election was held to replace Vincent Pyke after his death on 5 June. The winner was William Larnach, who became a cabinet minister.

Results
The following table gives the election result:

Notes

Tuapeka 1894
1894 elections in New Zealand
Politics of Otago